The International Circus Hall of Fame is a museum and hall of fame which honors important figures in circus history.  It is located in Peru, Indiana on the former grounds of the Wallace Circus and American Circus Corporation Winter Quarters, also known as the Peru Circus Farm and Valley Farms.  The property includes rare surviving circus buildings from the late 19th and early 20th centuries, and was designated a National Historic Landmark for its historical importance.

Property history
The Peru property was a prosperous farm when it was purchased in 1891 by Benjamin Wallace, owner of the Wallace Circus.  From then until 1944 the property served as the winter quarters for a succession of circus companies, most created by succession or merger with Wallace's operation.  In 1921, the American Circus Corporation acquired the property and Wallace's circus operation, and expanded the facilities.  American Circus was sold to John Ringling in 1929, and it housed Ringling Brothers operations until declines in the circus business prompted its closure in 1944.  The property was then returned to agricultural use, and a number of the surviving circus-related buildings were significantly altered or demolished.

Museum history

The Ringling Brothers Circus had established their winter quarters in Sarasota, Florida in 1927, with a large amount of help by Victor Sabattini (1916–2010), an insurance executive, who later became the president and chairman of the board. In the mid-1950s the idea to create a hall of fame to honor outstanding circus artists was conceived of by circus fans in the Sarasota community and in 1956 the Circus Hall of Fame opened.  Located near the Sarasota airport, the Hall of Fame included exhibition space in several buildings filled with circus memorabilia, including personal effects from famous circus artists and impresarios – costumes, props, posters and circus wagons. In addition to the exhibits, the Circus Hall of Fame presented circus acts several times a day, during several months each year.

In addition to visits by Florida tourists, the Circus Hall of Fame received national exposure. NBC-TV broadcast "The Circus Hall of Fame All Star Circus" on Sept. 12, 1970. The host, Ed McMahon, conveyed congratulations to the four newly named inductees to the Circus Hall of Fame for 1970 including famous circus performers, The Rieffenach Sisters (bareback riders), aerialists Mayme Ward and Ira Millette, and circus impresario Billy Smart Sr.

Although up to 80,000 tourists visited the Circus Hall of Fame each year, by the late 1970s it was unprofitable and the owners prepared to close the museum. In 1980 the lease on the property expired and on May 27, 1980, the Sarasota Circus Hall of Fame had its last performance.

In 1981 a group of citizens from Peru, Indiana, learned that the effects of the Circus Hall of Fame were for sale. Interested in preserving the circus artifacts and concerned that they might be auctioned off separately, Indiana residents, businesses and the state government contributed to the purchase of the entire collection to bring it to the former Wallace property in Peru. Many other items have since been added to the original Sarasota collection, including 16 historical wagons reconstructed in the Hall of Fame wagon shop and the Peru Wagon Works Shop.

Prominent inductees

1958 Lillian Leitzel
1960 William C. Coup
1960 James Anthony Bailey
1960 P. T. Barnum
1961 Bird Millman
1961 The Ringling Brothers
1962 Dan Rice
1963 Adam Forepaugh
1963 May Wirth
1963 Victor Pépin
1964 Isaac Van Amburgh
1964 Philip Astley
1965 Clyde Beatty
1966 Con Colleano
1969 Mabel Stark
1970 Billy Smart Sr.
1971 Karl King
1972 Felix Adler
1972 George A. Hamid Sr.
1973 Otto Griebling
1974 Buffalo Bill Cody
1974 Tom Mix
1975 Merle Evans
1975 The Zacchini Brothers
1977 William Preston Hall
1979 The Wallenda Troupe
1980 Mollie Bailey
1981 The Albert Hodgini Troupe
1986 John Ringling North
1987 Irvin Feld
1987 Bertram Mills
1989 Lou Jacobs
1991 The Great Wilno
1994 Emmett Kelly
1996 Knie family
1997 Annie Oakley
1997 Thomas Taplin Cooke
1999 Gunther Gebel-Williams
2001 Elvin Bale
2003 Hugo Zacchini
2005 Miles White
2006 Kenneth Feld
2006 Francis Brunn
2009 Cecil B. DeMille
2009 Paul Binder              
2010 Henry Ringling North
2011 Norman Barrett
2012 Freddie Freeman           
2014 Terry Cavaretta
2016 Barry Lubin

See also
Hagenbeck-Wallace Circus
Terrell Jacobs Circus Winter Quarters
International Clown Hall of Fame

References

External links

Journals of Yesteryear: "Hall founded to honor circus folks"

Commercial buildings on the National Register of Historic Places in Indiana
National Register of Historic Places in Miami County, Indiana
Halls of fame in Indiana
Circus museums in the United States
Museums in Miami County, Indiana